State Road 163 (SR 163) was a  north–south state highway in Duval County. It traveled in a question mark shape, completely within the northeastern part of Jacksonville.

Route description
SR 163 began at an intersection with SR 105 (Heckscher Drive), near the Jacksonville Zoo and Gardens. It headed to the north before curving to the northeast. The road curved back to the north, then to the northwest and west, before meeting its northern terminus, an intersection with U.S. Route 17 (US 17; North Main Street) at the southeastern edge of the Anheuser-Busch brewery. This intersection also marks the eastern terminus of SR 104 (Dunn Avenue).

Major intersections

See also

References

163
163
163